Sotiris Antoniou (born 10 September 1975) is a Greek professional football manager and former player.

Playing career
He began his career as a footballer from his hometown team Apollon Larissa in 1995. He played for almost 15 years for many historical clubs such as Xanthi, Doxa Drama, Kerkyra, Trikala, and Korinthos.

Managerial career
He holds an UEFA Pro Coaching Licence.

References

External links
Sotiris Antoniou profile at www.onsports.gr (in Greek)
Interview at aelole.gr (youtube) (in Greek)

1975 births
Living people
Footballers from Larissa
Association football midfielders
Greek footballers
Trikala F.C. players
Xanthi F.C. players
Apollon Pontou FC players
Fostiras F.C. players
Ethnikos Asteras F.C. players
A.O. Kerkyra players
PAS Giannina F.C. players
Doxa Drama F.C. players
AEL Kalloni F.C. players
Greek football managers
Super League Greece managers
AEL Kalloni F.C. managers
Paniliakos F.C. managers
Panachaiki F.C. managers
Trikala F.C. managers
Athlitiki Enosi Larissa F.C. managers
PAS Lamia 1964 managers
Levadiakos F.C. managers